The Miller Brewing Company is an American brewery and beer company in Milwaukee, Wisconsin. It was founded in 1855 by Frederick Miller. Molson Coors acquired the full global brand portfolio of Miller Brewing Company in 2016, and operates the Miller Brewery at the site of the original Miller Brewing Company complex.

History

Miller Brewing Company was founded in 1855 by Frederick Miller after his emigration from Hohenzollern, Germany in 1854 with a unique brewer's yeast. Initially, he purchased the small Plank Road Brewery in Milwaukee for $2,300 ($66,736 in 2018). The brewery's location in what is now the Miller Valley provided easy access to raw materials produced on nearby farms. In 1855, Miller changed its name to Miller Brewing Company, Inc. The enterprise remained in the family until 1966.

The company was one of the six breweries affected by the 1953 Milwaukee brewery strike.

In 1966, the conglomerate W. R. Grace and Company bought Miller from Lorraine John Mulberger (Frederick Miller's granddaughter, who objected to alcohol) and her family. In 1969, Philip Morris (now Altria) bought Miller from W. R. Grace for $130 million, outbidding PepsiCo.

In 1999 Miller acquired the Hamm's brand from Pabst.

In 2002, South African Breweries bought Miller from Philip Morris for $3.6 billion worth of stock and $2 billion in debt to form SABMiller, with Philip Morris retaining a 36% ownership share and 24.99% voting rights.

In 2006, SABMiller purchased the Sparks and Steel Reserve brands from McKenzie River Corporation for $215 million cash. Miller had been producing both brands prior to the purchase.

On July 1, 2008, SABMiller formed MillerCoors, a joint venture with rival Molson Coors, to consolidate the production and distribution of its products in the United States, with each parent company's corporate operations and international operations to remain separate and independent of the joint venture. SABMiller owned 58% of the unit, which operated in the United States but not in Canada, where Molson Coors is strongest, but the companies had equal voting power.

Sole ownership by Molson Coors
In September 2015, Anheuser-Busch InBev announced that it had reached a full agreement to acquire SABMiller for $107 billion. As part of the agreement with the U.S. Justice Department, SABMiller agreed to divest itself of the Miller brands in the US and Puerto Rico by selling its stake in MillerCoors to Molson Coors. Consequently, on October 11, 2016, SABMiller in the U.S. sold its interests in MillerCoors to Molson Coors for around US$12 billion. Molson Coors gained full ownership of the Miller brand portfolio outside the US and Puerto Rico, and retained the rights to all of the brands that were in the MillerCoors portfolio for the U.S. and Puerto Rico.

Brands

Brands with the Miller name, or historically sold by Miller Brewing company, include:

: A pilsner-style beer introduced in 1903, High Life is Miller Brewing's oldest brand and is 4.6% abv. It is noted for its high level of carbonation, like champagne, leading to its longtime slogan "The Champagne of Beers". It was one of the premier high-end beers in the country for many years. High Life bottles feature a bright gold label and are made of a clear glass that has a tapered neck like a champagne bottle. The label includes the "Girl in the Moon" logo, which features a woman in a circus costume seated on a crescent moon. The brand helped popularize  pony bottles, introduced in 1972. 
Miller Lite: A pilsner-type light beer. Introduced in 1972, it was the first light beer to see wide popularity. It is 4.2% abv (4% in Canada). 
Miller Genuine Draft: Nicknamed MGD, it was introduced in 1985 as "Miller High Life Genuine Draft". Developed to replicate the flavor of High Life from a non-pasteurized keg in a can or bottle, MGD is made from the same recipe as High Life but the beer is cold filtered instead of pasteurized. As of 2007 Genuine Draft had a 1.5% share of the United States market; by 2012 it had declined to 0.7% market share, representing a decline of 1.7 million barrels. It has 4.7% abv.
Miller 64: (Formerly Miller Genuine Draft 64) An "ultra light" beer with 2.8% abv, it contains . Miller launched this beer in the summer of 2007 in Madison, Wisconsin. It was received favorably and testing expanded to Arizona, San Diego and Sacramento.
Frederick Miller Classic Chocolate Lager: A seasonal lager available from October to December in Wisconsin, Chicago, Minneapolis, Cleveland, Indianapolis and northwest Indiana. It is brewed with six different malts, including chocolate and dark chocolate malts.
Miller Sharp's: A non-alcoholic beer introduced in 1989.

Economy brands
Milwaukee's Best: Miller's economy label. It is 4.3% abv, and commonly referred to as "The Beast", "Milwaukee's Beast", "Milwaukee's Worst" or "Milly B"
Milwaukee's Best Light: Light version of Milwaukee's Best. It was the main sponsor of the 2008 World Series of Poker. It is 4.1% abv. and commonly referred to as "Beast Light"
Milwaukee's Best Ice: Miller's economy ice beer. It is 5.9% abv and commonly referred to as "Beast Ice" or "the Yeti".

Malt liquor
Mickey's: Mickey's is a malt liquor that is 5.6% abv.
Olde English 800: Malt liquor also known as "OE". It is 5.9% abv in the eastern United States, 7.5% abv in most western U.S. states and 8.0% abv in Canada.

Discontinued
Miller High Life Light: Introduced in 1994, it had 4.1% abv. It was discontinued in 2021 to focus on Miller Lite.
Miller Chill: A chelada-style 4.2% abv pale lager brewed with lime and salt. Introduced successfully in 2007, sales dropped in 2008 after the launch of the rival Bud Light Lime. In response, MillerCoors revamped their recipe from a 'chelada' style brew to a light beer with lime, created new packaging which included switching from a green to a clear bottle, and launched a new advertising campaign centered around the slogan "How a Light Beer with a Taste of Lime Should Taste". It was discontinued in 2013.

Sponsorships
Miller has been a large motorsport sponsor since the 1980s. In the CART World Series, the company has sponsored drivers such as Al Unser (1984), Danny Sullivan (1985–1989, 1991), Roberto Guerrero (1990), Bobby Rahal (1992–1998) and Kenny Bräck (2003). It also sponsored the Miller 200 race at Mid-Ohio.

In the NASCAR Cup Series, Miller has sponsored Bobby Allison from 1983 to 1988, Dick Trickle in 1989, Rusty Wallace from 1990 to 2005, Kurt Busch from 2006 to 2010, and Brad Keselowski since 2011. Allison won the 1983 NASCAR Winston Cup Series, and Keselowski won the 2012 NASCAR Sprint Cup Series. The company has sponsored the Miller High Life 500, Miller 500, Miller High Life 400, Miller 400, Miller 300, Miller 200, and Miller 150 races.

In the NHRA, Miller sponsored Larry Dixon for 11 years until 2007.

From its opening in 2001 until the end of 2020, Miller owned the naming rights to Miller Park, home of the Milwaukee Brewers when the naming rights were bought by American Family Insurance in 2019.

See also
 Beer in Milwaukee
 Windell Middlebrooks

References

External links
 Official website

Manufacturing companies based in Milwaukee
Beer brewing companies based in Wisconsin
American companies established in 1855
1855 establishments in Wisconsin
SABMiller
Food and drink companies established in 1855
Molson Coors Beverage Company
Companies based in Milwaukee